Chowki Choura, Akhnoor, is a Sub-Division in Jammu district in Jammu and Kashmir, India.

Located  from Jammu, Chowki Choura is located in the foothills of the Himalayas. The town is located on the bed of Kali Dhar Range surrounded by Khadhandhara Valley on east side of it. The Chowki Choura used to be in Akhnoor Tehsil. On 21 October 2014 Chowki Choura was bifurcated from Akhnoor Sub-Division. Chowki Choura Sub-Division comprises Chowki Choura Tehsil, Chowki Choura Block, Chowki Choura Education. It is also part of proposed Jammu-Akhnoor-Rajouri-Poonch Rail Line. Chowki Choura Tehsil comprises Ghar Majoor, Chowki Choura, Rah Salyote Niabats.

Geography
Chowki Choura is located at the right bank of the Tawi River. Tawi merged with Chenab River at Kathar Village (Mera Mandrian Tehsil). On the North and East, the Shiwaliks, Kali Dhar  and Trikuta range surround it. Chowki Choura lies on (Mughal Road) Jammu-Poonch National Highway about 28 km away from Jammu. It connects with Rajouri District on North, Reasi District on East and Chamb Tehsil (Pakistan Jammu Kashmir Area) on West.

Demographics
 India census, Chowki Choura had a population of 1,145. Males constitute 52% of the population and females 48%. Chowki Choura has an average literacy rate of 78%, higher than the national average of 59.5%; with 56% of the males and 47% of females literate.

The languages spoken are Dogri followed by Gojri, Hindi and English.

References

External links
 Akhnoor  on Akhnoor's tourism portal
  Akhnoor Photo Gallery
 Akhnoor on Jammu's tourism portal
 Akhnoor on Kashmir-Tibet tourism portal

Cities and towns in Jammu district